Raman Patrick Sisupalan is an English former professional footballer of Indian descent who is currently working as foreign coaches liaison at Kovalam FC of the Kerala Premier League. He played as a midfielder and last played for Viva Kerala FC of the I-League as a player of Indian origin.

Personal life
Born in England, Sisupalan began his football career in London and spent some years teaching at Alexandra Park School before moving to India to play professional football. He also worked at the Petchey Academy and at Northumberland Park Community School.

Club career
During his early career, he played football for University of Rio Grande and futsal for FC White Bear. He later switched to football predominantly, as his professional career.

Viva Kerala
He signed for Kerala-based I-League side Viva Kerala in 2009. Under the coaching of A M Sreedharan, he was all set to be debuted for Viva Kerala in the IFA Shield in Kolkata, against East Bengal FC. But later, the club withdrew from the tournament due to failure to register players on time and Sisupalan missed the debut opportunity.

Managerial career
From 2010 to 2012, Sisupalan managed the soccer team of Petchey Academy in Kingsland School, Dalston, East London.

Sisupalan is currently in the managing committee of the Kerala Premier League outfit Kovalam FC from 2012. He works as a foreign coaches liaison in the Thiruvananthapuram-based side. He along with Ebin Rose, coordinates the training facilities of the Kovalam FC, which is currently set up in the newly formed stadium at Arumanoor near Neyyattinkara.

References

Indian footballers
Living people
1981 births
Association football midfielders
British people of Indian descent